Stephen J. Grenda (May 23, 1910 – September 21, 1971) was an American college football head coach who was Delaware football program's eighteenth head coach. He led them to a 4–12 overall record in two seasons.

Head coaching record

References

1910 births
1971 deaths
American football guards
Columbia Lions football coaches
Columbia Lions football players
Delaware Fightin' Blue Hens football coaches
Sportspeople from Lawrence, Massachusetts